Patrick Henry Tyrance Jr., is an American orthopaedic surgeon and a former Academic All American linebacker who played for the University of Nebraska Cornhuskers football team. He was selected by the Los Angeles Rams in the 1991 NFL draft, and earned his MD from Harvard Medical School in 1997. He is considered one of the most academically decorated athletes in Nebraska football history.

Early life 
Tyrance was born to Patrick and Geraldine Tyrance on July 30, 1968 in Baltimore, MD.

Education 
Tyrance graduated from Millard North High School in Omaha, Nebraska in 1986. He then attended the University of Nebraska–Lincoln from 1986 -1990, where he studied pre-med and achieved a grade point average of 3.46.

After finishing college, he went on to obtain two post-graduate degrees from Harvard. He obtained his MD from Harvard Medical School in 1997 and also the Master of Public Policy in Healthcare Policy from Harvard Kennedy School in the same year.

Football career 
He excelled at football both at high school and college level. He finished his senior in year in Nebraska with a total of 208 stops, making him the 12th highest tackler in Nebraska's footballing history. He was the 201st pick in the 1991 NFL Draft, being picked in the eighth round by the Los Angeles Rams, though he chose to pursue further studies.

Medical career 
He interned at the Massachusetts General Hospital after his graduation. From 1999 to 2002, he was a member of the core curriculum committee at Harvard Orthopedics and organized a two-year curriculum for orthopedic residents in diagnosis and management of spine pathology. In 2001, he spent a month in Pristhina, Kosovo, where he performed nine operations, including the first total hip arthroplasty in Kosovo, along with a team of three other surgeons. He was recognized as the outstanding resident teacher by Harvard Medical School students in 2001. After serving his residency at Massachusetts General Hospital, Tyrance worked as an orthopedic surgeon in the Omaha area until 2016. He also worked as team physician at Millard North High School for close to 10 years.  In 2015, he earned his MBA from The George Washington University School of Business. He currently works as an orthopedic surgeon in Florida and engages in motivational speaking and entrepreneurship. Tyrance is the director of public policy and advocacy at the LES Society and is a partner and advisor at Park Technologies, Inc. He also serves as a consultant/advisor for business practices FruitStreet.com and AMPT Health, among others.

Awards and recognition 
 CoSIDA Academic All-America Hall of Fame Inductee (2009)
 Nebraska Football Hall of Fame Inductee (2005)
 NCAA Today's Top Six Award (1990)
 Nebraska Co-Captain (1990)
 Two-Time All-Big Eight (1989, 1990)
 National Football Foundation Scholar-Athlete

References

External links
Statistics at Huskers.com

1968 births
Living people
Nebraska Cornhuskers football players
Harvard Medical School alumni
Harvard Kennedy School alumni
African-American business executives
George Washington University School of Business alumni
African-American physicians